The Architects' Council of Europe is a professional organisation of architects from Europe that aims to help advance architecture and maintain its quality. It was founded on 11 May 1990 in Treviso, Italy by the merger of two organisations: the Liaison Committee of the Architects of the United Europe and the Council of European Architects.

Executive Board
The executive board for 2022-2023:

Ruth Schagemann (Germany) / President

Fulgencio Avilés Inglés (Spain)
Dubravko Bacic (Croatia)
Carl Bäckstrand (Sweden)
Christos Christodoulou (Cyprus)
Borys Czarakcziew (Poland)
Daniel Fügenschuh (Austria)
Selma Harrington (Ireland)
Paul Jeppesen (Denmark)
Ruta Leitenaite (Lithuania) 
Diego Zoppi (Italy)

Members

The ACE functions as a federation that is composed of 44 Member Organisations, such as:

 The Association of German Architects
 The Royal Institute of the Architects of Ireland
 The Slovak Chamber of Architects
 The Royal Institute of British Architects
 The Danish Association of Architects
The Conseil National de l'Ordre des Architectes CNOA

The Member Organisations meet in a yearly General Assembly. In 2021, the ACE General Assembly was held in Brussels.

Policies
On 4 May 2019, in Innsbruck (Austria), the Architects’ Council of Europe presented a "Statement on Achieving Quality in the Built Environment", on the occasion of its Conference on the theme “How to Achieve Quality in the Built Environment: Quality assurance tools and systems”.

References

External links 
 

Treviso
1990 establishments in Italy
International professional associations based in Europe
Architecture-related professional associations
Arts organizations based in Europe
Arts organizations established in 1990
Organisations based in Brussels